De Soto is a village mostly in Vernon County but also in Crawford County in Wisconsin. The population was 287 at the 2010 census. Of this, 179 were in living in Vernon County, and 108 were living in Crawford County. The downtown and business area is located in Crawford County.

History
De Soto was named after Hernando De Soto the explorer who discovered the Mississippi.

Geography
De Soto is located at  (43.426905, -91.196841).

Demographics

2010 census
As of the census of 2010, there were 287 people, 129 households, and 80 families living in the village. The racial makeup of the village was 99.7% White and 0.3% from two or more races.

There were 129 households, of which 31.0% had children under the age of 18 living with them, 48.8% were married couples living together, 10.1% had a female householder with no husband present, 3.1% had a male householder with no wife present, and 38.0% were non-families. 31.8% of all households were made up of individuals, and 15.5% had someone living alone who was 65 years of age or older. The average household size was 2.22 and the average family size was 2.83.

The median age in the village was 44.1 years. 23.3% of residents were under the age of 18; 3.9% were between the ages of 18 and 24; 24.5% were from 25 to 44; 31.8% were from 45 to 64; and 16.7% were 65 years of age or older. The gender makeup of the village was 51.2% male and 48.8% female.

2000 census
As of the census of 2000, there were 366 people, 151 households, and 104 families living in the village. The population density was 283.6 people per square mile (109.5/km2). There were 191 housing units at an average density of 148.0 per square mile (57.2/km2). The racial makeup of the village was 95.08% White, 1.64% African American, 0.55% Asian, 0.27% from other races, and 2.46% from two or more races. Hispanic or Latino of any race were 1.64% of the population.

There were 151 households, out of which 26.5% had children under the age of 18 living with them, 61.6% were married couples living together, 4.0% had a female householder with no husband present, and 30.5% were non-families. 25.2% of all households were made up of individuals, and 13.2% had someone living alone who was 65 years of age or older. The average household size was 2.42 and the average family size was 2.93.

In the village, the population was spread out, with 22.7% under the age of 18, 4.4% from 18 to 24, 23.5% from 25 to 44, 32.2% from 45 to 64, and 17.2% who were 65 years of age or older. The median age was 44 years. For every 100 females, there were 89.6 males. For every 100 females age 18 and over, there were 88.7 males.

The median income for a household in the village was $33,036, and the median income for a family was $40,000. Males had a median income of $30,313 versus $16,250 for females. The per capita income for the village was $18,042. About 7.4% of families and 7.4% of the population were below the poverty line, including 13.7% of those under age 18 and 7.0% of those age 65 or over.

Education

The De Soto Area Schools serves De Soto, Wisconsin. De Soto Area schools consists of De Soto High/Middle School in De Soto, Wisconsin, Prairie View Elementary School and Stoddard Elementary School.

Transportation
Bus service towards La Crosse and Prairie du Chien is provided three times daily per direction by Scenic Mississippi Regional Transit.

Notable people
 George B. Belting, Wisconsin State Representative and lawyer, was born in De Soto.
 Jacob Eckhardt, Wisconsin State Representative, lived in De Soto.
 Francis A. Wallar, Medal of Honor recipient, lived in De Soto.

See also
 List of villages in Wisconsin

References

External links

 De Soto, Wisconsin

Villages in Vernon County, Wisconsin
Villages in Crawford County, Wisconsin
Villages in Wisconsin
Wisconsin populated places on the Mississippi River